Tony Todd (born December 4, 1954) is an American actor who made his debut as Sgt. Warren in the film Platoon (1986), and portrayed Kurn in the television series Star Trek: The Next Generation (1990–1991) and Star Trek: Deep Space Nine (1996). He achieved stardom for his roles as Ben in the 1990 remake of Night of the Living Dead, as the title character in the four films of the Candyman film series (1992–2021) and William Bludworth in the Final Destination franchise (2000–2011). He also starred as Dan in The Man from Earth (2007) and voiced The Fallen in Transformers: Revenge of the Fallen (2009), Darkseid in the DC Animated Movie Universe,  Zoom in The Flash and Venom in the upcoming Spider-Man 2 (2023) game.

Early life and education
Todd was born on December 4, 1954 in Washington, D.C. and grew up in Hartford, Connecticut, attending local schools including Hartford Public High School. He is also an alumnus of the Artists Collective, Inc. Todd attended the University of Connecticut and then went on to study theater at the Tony Award-winning Eugene O'Neill National Actors Theatre Institute, and the Trinity Repertory Company in Providence, Rhode Island. His sister is actress Monique Dupree.

Career

Film
Todd has appeared in more than 100 theatrical and television films and has played opposite many major Hollywood stars. His film credits include: Platoon (1986), Night of the Living Dead (1990), Candyman (1992), The Crow (1994), The Rock (1996), Wishmaster (1997), the Final Destination series (2000–2011), Minotaur (2006), and Beg (2010). Todd was the voice of The Fallen in Transformers: Revenge of the Fallen (2009) and was also in the Rel Dowdell film Changing the Game. Todd was a special guest of the Weekend of Horror Creation Entertainment on May 23, 2010, and Screamfest LA. Todd portrayed Reverend Zombie in Hatchet II, which was released in a limited number of theaters on October 1, 2010. As Final Destination 5 returned to the series' roots, Todd returned as William Bludworth.

Broadway
Todd has acted on and off Broadway. Among his many roles are August Wilson's King Hedley II, Athol Fugard's The Captain's Tiger, for which he received the Helen Hayes nomination. Others include No Place to be Somebody, Les Blancs, Playboys of the West Indies, Othello, Zooman and The Sign, award-winning playwright Keith Glover's Dark Paradise, Aida (on Broadway), and Levee James for the Eugene O'Neill Playwrights Conference and The New Dramatist Guild.

Television

Todd's other television appearances include a recurring role on Boston Public and guest appearances on Law & Order, Homicide: Life on the Street, Hercules: The Legendary Journeys, Xena: Warrior Princess as Cecrops, The X-Files, Smallville, Psych, 24, Charmed, Stargate SG-1, Andromeda, Criminal Minds, 21 Jump Street, and Chuck.

Todd is one of the few actors to have portrayed two different speaking roles on 24. He was initially cast as Detective Michael Norris in season three and four years later as General Benjamin Juma in both 24: Redemption and season 7. He also played a major role in the Babylon 5 TV film A Call to Arms.

He has portrayed several characters in the Star Trek universe: Worf's brother Kurn in Star Trek: The Next Generation and Star Trek: Deep Space Nine, an adult Jake Sisko in the episode "The Visitor" in Star Trek: Deep Space Nine, and an Alpha Hirogen in the episode "Prey" in Star Trek: Voyager. In 2017, Todd returned to the world of Star Trek as General Rodek in the MMORPG game Star Trek Online; Rodek was the persona taken on by Kurn after he lost the memories of his past life as Worf's brother in the Star Trek: Deep Space Nine episode "Sons of Mogh".

Todd has also provided the voices of the Decepticon Dreadwing on Transformers: Prime, and Icon in Young Justice.

In 2015, Todd was cast as the disguised voice of Zoom in the second season of The Flash.

On October 12, 2018, it was confirmed by Bloody Disgusting that Todd would star in a recurring role in Scream: Resurrection, the third season of the slasher television series Scream. The season premiered on VH1 on July 8, 2019.

Audio drama
Todd played the title character in Bleak December Inc.'s 2016 audio drama adaptation of Bram Stoker's Dracula.

Filmography

Film

Television

Video games

References

External links

 
 https://pandafilm.club/actor/a-Toni-Todd

1954 births
Living people
Male actors from Washington, D.C.
American male film actors
African-American male actors
American male stage actors
Male actors from Hartford, Connecticut
University of Connecticut alumni
20th-century American male actors
21st-century American male actors
American male voice actors
American male television actors
20th-century African-American people
21st-century African-American people